Neue Flora (Stage Theater Neue Flora) is a musical theatre in Hamburg, owned and operated by Stage Entertainment.

History 
In 1987 Stella Entertainment was looking for a new musical theatre in Hamburg, after their success with Cats in the Operettenhaus. Together with the city they picked the Rote Flora, but after massive protests and after squatters took over the building Stella abandoned their plans. In Altona the company found a new site for their theater and after a construction period of 22 months and again many protest the theater opened in 1990 with Das Phantom der Oper.

At the beginning of the millennium Stella Entertainment got into financial troubles, resulting in a bankruptcy. The Dutch company Stage Entertainment (Stage Holding at the time) acquired several parts of Stella Entertainment, including the Neue Flora in 2002.

Productions

External links
 Stage Theater Neue Flora
Stage Entertainment Corporate

References

Theatres in Hamburg
Buildings and structures in Altona, Hamburg